General speed limits in New Zealand are set by the New Zealand government. The speed limit in each location is indicated on a nearby traffic sign or by the presence of street lighting. The limits have been posted in kilometres per hour (km/h) since 1974. Before then, when New Zealand used imperial units, maximum speeds were displayed in miles per hour (mph).

History
A 30 mile (48 kilometre) per hour speed limit was imposed in 1930. The limit was raised as vehicles became more powerful. Emergency legislation during the Second World War had amended the general speed limit set by the 1936 Traffic Regulations to 40 mph in order to reduce tyre wear and improve road safety. In 1948, the general speed limit was increased to 50 mph.

When New Zealand metricated in 1975, the 50 mph speed limit became 80 km/h while the urban 30 mph speed limit became 50 km/h. Metric speed limits included the legend "km/h" to distinguish them from imperial speed limits; this was dropped from 1987 onwards.

Enforcement of New Zealand road speed limits was traditionally done using police speed cameras set up and operated by the police. In 1993, mobile speed cameras were introduced.

Significant changes were made to the rules for setting speed limits in 2003 and 2011, including provision for 40 km/h limits. However, it was then necessary to introduce the Land Transport (Speed Limits Validation) Bill in 2015 to confirm the legitimacy of the previous changes. Another significant change in August 2017 introduced a provision for 110 km/h limits on some motorways and expressways.

Current speed limits
By default, the speed limit is 50 km/h in urban and built-up areas, and 100 km/h outside urban and built-up areas and on expressways and motorways.

Other speed limits include:
110 km/h – found on selected high-quality motorways and expressways.
90 km/h – used sparingly as a compromise between an 80 km/h and a 100 km/h limit.
80 km/h – generally found on rural access roads, winding rural roads, and limited-access urban arterial roads. Between metrication in 1975 and 1985, 80 km/h was the open road limit.
70 km/h – used sparingly as a compromise between a 60 km/h and an 80 km/h limit. Historically it has been used in small country towns, urban fringes (often preceding a change from the open limit to urban limit), or where development is on only one side of the road.
60 km/h – generally found on urban arterial roads, including those through rural townships.
40 km/h – generally found in residential areas. The Land Transport Rule: Setting of Speed Limits 2003 allowed councils to set limits below 50 km/h in urban areas. Since then many councils have set lower limits. For example, Safer Speed Areas were first introduced in Hamilton in 2011 and by 2014 there were 36 of them.–
30 km/h – generally found in some city centres with high pedestrian traffic. 
20 km/h – when approaching and passing a school bus that has stopped on either side of the road to pick up or set down passengers. This speed limit applies to traffic travelling in both directions. Also applies when passing an accident scene.
10 km/h – Often found in designated locations such as car-parks and other places where many vehicles and pedestrians share the road (Shared Zones).

110 km/h limits
To be considered for a 110 km/h limit, the road must be a dual carriageway, with a median barrier, no at-grade intersections, and no corners rated for a speed below 110 km/h. Vehicles subject to a lower maximum speed, such as heavy trucks and towing vehicles, are still subject to that lower limit.

The first two roads with a 110 km/h speed limit were gazetted on 28 November 2017, with the speed limits coming into force on 11 December 2017. These roads are:

 SH 1 Waikato Expressway, from around 1.3 km south of the Tamahere interchange (SH 21) to the end of the expressway at the Cambridge South interchange.
 SH 2 Tauranga Eastern Link, from the Domain Road interchange to the end of the motorway at the Paengaroa roundabout (SH 33).
Following the opening of the Hamilton section of the Waikato Expressway in July 2022, the 110 km/h limit on the expressway was extended northward to the Hampton Downs interchange.

Types of speed limit
There are several different types of speed limit:
Default - The default speed limit is only posted as the speed limit when entering or leaving the designated urban and rural areas. In urban areas the default speed limit is 50 km/h, while in rural areas the speed limit is 100 km/h. The definition of an urban area is based on the presence of street lighting.
Permanent - where the posted speed limit is set for the specific section of road. There are repeater signs every 2 to 3 kilometers on these roads. These limits are often posted in areas where the urban or rural nature of the area is not obvious to road users and applying the default speed limit is unsafe.
Holiday - where the posted speed limit only applies for specific (holiday) periods. Outside the specific period the speed limit sign is removed or not visible. An example is on  through Pelorus Bridge, which has a holiday speed limit of 50 km/h annually between 20 December and 31 January, but outside these dates the default limit of 100 km/h applies.
Variable - where the speed limit can change at different times of the day due to the changing nature of road hazards. Often found in the school zone around many educational institutions. May also be encountered on roads that have peak hour congestion or weather related hazards. Traffic travelling in different directions may potentially encounter different limits.
Temporary - are put in place when there is work taking place on or near the road that makes the existing speed limit unsafe.
Emergency - can be imposed during and after natural disasters, such as earthquakes, floods, fires, tornadoes, etc. where existing speed limits are unsafe.

Advisory speeds
Advisory speeds are often given for road bends, corners, humps, dips and other short sections of road where driving at the speed limit may be uncomfortable or unsafe. These advisory speeds are indicated by a yellow sign with black lettering. They advise of a comfortable speed through a corner in dry weather for a light motor vehicle. Heavy vehicle drivers are advised to keep 10 km/h below the advisory speed to avoid exceeding the static rollover threshold.

Minimum speed 

Although there is no minimum posted speed limit, it is illegal to drive at an "unreasonably slow speed" which means slow drivers are required by law to pull over to the side of the road to allow queues of cars behind them to pass. The police can and do enforce this law in which the offending driver is given anything from an NZ$150 infringement notice for "Inconsiderate Driving" to possibly an indictment for careless driving which is usually dealt with by the courts.

Operating speed limits 
Certain types and combinations of vehicles have operating speed limits that need to be obeyed if they are less than the posted speed limit. For example: Vehicles towing trailers or another vehicle with a rigid towing connection are limited to 90 km/h. If the towing connection is not rigid, such as a rope or strop, then the operating limit is 50 km/h, apart from disabled motorcycles.

Signage
New Zealand speed limit signs follow the European model of a number inside a red circle. Sometimes, the open road limit occurs as a black forward slash inside a thin black ring (similar to the UK's National Speed Limit sign).

References
Speed limits, New Zealand Road Code.
Policy and procedures for setting speed limits, Speed Limits New Zealand.

Citations

New Zealand
Road transport in New Zealand